2 Corinthians 6 is the sixth chapter of the Second Epistle to the Corinthians in the New Testament of the Christian Bible. It is authored by Paul the Apostle and Timothy (2 Corinthians 1:1) in Macedonia in 55–56 CE.

Text
The original text was written in Koine Greek. This chapter is divided into 18 verses.

Textual witnesses
Some early manuscripts containing the text of this chapter are:
Papyrus 46 (~AD 200)
Codex Vaticanus (325–350)
Codex Sinaiticus (330–360)
Codex Alexandrinus (400–440)
Codex Ephraemi Rescriptus (~450)
Codex Freerianus (~450; extant verses 6–8,16–18)
Codex Claromontanus (~550)

Old Testament references
 : 
 : ; ; 
 : ; 
 :

Verse 2
Paul quotes the first part of  using the Septuagint version. The full text of this verse reads:
Thus saith the Lord,
"In an acceptable time have I heard thee, and in a day of salvation have I succored thee: and I have formed thee, and given thee for a covenant of the nations, to establish the earth, and to cause to inherit the desert heritages".
The promised hearing and salvation are offered first to the "suffering servant" in the time of the prophet Isaiah, then to Christ according to Christian interpretation of the servant songs, and finally, here, to the Christian people. Paul adds that the day concerned is "now".

Verse 14
 Do not be unequally yoked together with unbelievers. For what fellowship has righteousness with lawlessness? And what communion has light with darkness?
"What fellowship has righteousness with lawlessness" (or KJV: unrighteousness"): This "righteousness" means righteous persons, having the kingdom of God in them.

These verses have been understood in traditional forms of Christianity as prohibiting a marriage between a Christian and a non-Christian.

See also 
Transfiguration of Jesus
Related Bible parts: Leviticus 26, Isaiah 49, Isaiah 52, Isaiah 55, Psalm 69, Romans 8, Revelation 6, Revelation 21

References

Sources

External links 
 King James Bible - Wikisource
English Translation with Parallel Latin Vulgate
Online Bible at GospelHall.org (ESV, KJV, Darby, American Standard Version, Bible in Basic English)
Multiple bible versions at Bible Gateway (NKJV, NIV, NRSV etc.)

2 Corinthians 6